A botanical garden is a place where plants, especially ferns, conifers and flowering plants, are grown and displayed for the purposes of research and education. This distinguishes them from parks and pleasure gardens where plants, usually with showy flowers, are grown for public amenity only. Botanical gardens that specialize in trees are sometimes referred to as arboretums.  They are occasionally associated with universities and zoos.

Research botanical gardens
Abdul Wali Khan University Botanical Garden, Mardan
 Botanic Garden of Islamia University, Bahawalpur
Botanical Garden, Governor's House, Lahore
Botanical Garden, Govt Zamindar College, Gujrat
 Botanic Garden of Qarshi Industries, Hattar
 Danishmandan Botanic Garden, Lahore
Botanical Garden, University of the Punjab, Quaid-e-Azam Campus, Lahore
 Botanic Garden of Government College for Women, Samanabad, Lahore
Botanic Garden of Government College University, Faisalabad
 Botanic Garden University of Agriculture, Faisalabad
Faisalabad Botanical Gardens (part of Gatwala Wildlife Park), Faisalabad
Forman Christian College Botanic Garden, Lahore
 Botanical Collections of Kashyap's Museum at Government College University, Lahore, Lahore
Lahore Botanical Gardens of Government College University, Lahore, Lahore
 Botanic Garden at Sindh University, Jamshoro
Karachi University Botanic Garden of Karachi University, Karachi
 Liaqat Ali Botanic Garden, Peshawar
National Herbarium, Islamabad
Pakistan Forest Institute Botanical Garden of Pakistan Forest Institute, Peshawar
Quaid-i-Azam University Botanical Garden, Islamabad
Shah Abdul Latif Herbarium and Botanical Garden of Shah Abdul Latif University, Khairpur
University of Peshawar Botanical Garden of University of Peshawar, Peshawar
Living plants museum of medicinal plants, Pakistan Forest Institute, Peshawar
 Shakarganj Sugar Research Institute Botanical Garden, Jhang

Public botanical gardens

Bagh-e-Jinnah, Lahore
Rani Bagh Arboretum, Hyderabad
Sukh Chayn Gardens, Lahore
Botanical Garden Jallo Lahore

See also

 List of botanical gardens
 List of parks and gardens in Pakistan
 List of zoos in Pakistan

References

External links
 Botanic Garden Conservation International's Garden Search Database

Pakistan
Botanical gardens